A failed supernova is an astronomical event in time domain astronomy in which a star suddenly brightens as in the early stage of a supernova, but then does not increase to the massive flux of a supernova. They could be counted as a subcategory of supernova imposters. They have sometimes misleadingly been called unnovae.

Overview
Failed supernovae are thought to create stellar black holes by the collapsing of a red supergiant star in the early stages of a supernova. When the star can no longer support itself, the core collapses completely, forming a stellar-mass black hole, and consuming the nascent supernova without having the massive explosion. For a distant observer, the red supergiant star will seem to wink out of existence with little or no flare-up. The observed instances of these disappearances seem to involve supergiant stars with masses above 17 solar masses.

Failed supernovae are one of several events that theoretically signal the advent of a black hole born from an extremely massive star, others including hypernovae and long-duration gamma-ray bursts.

Structure and process
Theoretically, a red supergiant star may be too massive to explode into a supernova, and collapse directly into being a black hole, without the bright flash. They would however generate a burst of gravitational waves. This process would occur in the higher mass red supergiants, explaining the absence of observed supernovae with such progenitors.

List of failed supernovae candidates

References

External links

+
Astronomical events